{{Infobox person
| name               = Rimal Ali
| nationality        = Pakistani
| occupation         = Professional dancer and model
| years_active       = 2017–present
| notable_works      =Saat Din Mohabbat In (2018)
}}

Rimal Ali Shah is a Pakistani transgender model and professional dancer. She made her film debut in 2018 with Saat Din Mohabbat In.

In March 2017, a well-known music band featured her as a transgender person in their music video. Whereas Rimal Ali has performed as an actress and model in many music videos to enter into showbiz and for her career. She is also working as an actress in two upcoming movies.

 Filmography 

 Saat Din Mohabbat In (2018) as Mona Lisa Rehbra''

See also
 Mehak Malik

References

External links

Pakistani transgender people
Transgender female models
Pakistani female models
Living people
Year of birth missing (living people)
Pakistani dancers